Kintoor or Kintur is a village in Barabanki district famous for battle of Kintoor of 1858 during the Indian Mutiny.

Battle of Kintoor

The Battle of Kintoor was a conflict between rebel sepoys and troops East India Company and Kapurthala State on 6 October 1858 during Indian Mutiny.

British Raj

During 1869 census of Oudh, Kintoor was designated as one of the total thirteen large towns or kasbahs and Inspector of Police of Ram Nagar was appointed here on the night of census.

Personalities

Nishapuri Sada'at of Kintoor

Many of the early Sufi saints that came to North India belonged to Sayyid families. Most of these Sayyid families came from Central Asia and Iran, but some also originate from Yemen, Oman, Iraq and Bahrain. Perhaps the most famous Sufi was Syed Salar Masud, from whom many of the Sayyid families of Awadh claim their descent. Sayyids of Jarwal (Bahraich), Kintoor (Barabanki) and Zaidpur (Barabanki) were wellknown Taluqadars (feudal lords) of Awadh province.

Abaqati family

A branch of the Nishapuri Kintoori Sayeds moved to Lucknow. The most famous of Kintoori Sayeds is Ayatollah Syed Mir Hamid Hussain Musavi, author of work entitled Abaqat al Anwar; the first word in the title of this work provided his descendantswith the nisba (title) they still bear, Abaqati. Syed Ali Nasir Saeed Abaqati Agha Roohi, a Lucknow based cleric is from the family of Nishapuri Kintoori Sayeds and uses title Abaqati.

Literary

Urdu/Persian (19th century)
 Abd ul-Qadir Hanif-ud-Din Kintoori (d. 1789): a Sufi of Qadri order. His ancestors emigrated from Nishapur, Iran, and served as jurists. He was author of the book Kuhl ul-jawahir fi manaqib-i-'Abd ul-Qadir Jilani(1753).
 Ayatollah Mufti Syed Muhammad Quli Khan Kintoori (1775-1844): principal Sadr Amin at the British court in Meerut. He was author of Tathir al-mu'minin 'an najasat al-mushrikin.
Syed Sirāj Ḥusayn Musavi Kintoori (1823-1865): son of Mufti Syed Muhammad Quli Kintoori, he was author of Kashf al-ḥujub wa-l-astār ʿan asmāʾ al-kutub wa-l-asfār, Shudhūr al-ʿiqyān fī tarājim al-aʿyān and Āʾīna-yi ḥaqq-numā.
Syed Iʿjāz Ḥusayn Musavi Kintoori (1825-1870),
 son of Mufti Syed Muhammad Quli Kintoori
 Ayatollah Syed Mir Hamid Hussain Musavi Kintoori Lakhnavi (1830-1880): son of Mufti Syed Muhammad Quli Kintoori author of book Abaqat ul Anwar fi Imamat al Ai'imma al-Athar.
 Qazi Mahmud Kintoori author of Mirat i Madari.

Urdu/Persian (20th century)
 Justice Maulvi Syed Karāmat Ḥusayn Musavi Kintoori (1854-1917): son of Syed Sirāj Ḥusayn Musavi Kintoori, he founded Karmat College, Lucknow.

Others
 Seyyed Ahmad Musavi Hindi: Paternal grandfather of Ayatollah Khomeini. He was born in Kintoor.

Attractions

 Parijaat tree a sacred baobab tree on the banks of Ghaghra.
 The famous Kunteshwar Temple – dedicated to Lord Shiva.

References

External links
 http://offerings.nic.in/directory/adminreps/viewGPmapcvills.asp?gpcode=48746&rlbtype=V
 http://ourvillageindia.org/Place.aspx?PID=562564
 http://maps.google.co.uk/maps?ll=27.01504,81.483387&z=12&t=h&hl=en
 https://online.omms.nic.in/ASPNet/citizens/DG/05DVC/CensusStatus.aspx?state=UP&district=13&block=13&reportLevel=3
 The British Empire – Indian Mutiny 1857–58
 Google Books – Battle at Kintoor
 "Indian Mutiny" by Saul David 2002 
 Shi'a Islam in Colonial India: Religion, Community and Sectarianism By Justin Jones
 

Kintoor
Kintoor, Battle of